Raúl Bauza (born 27 August 1934) is an Argentine modern pentathlete. He competed at the 1960 Summer Olympics.

References

1934 births
Living people
Argentine male modern pentathletes
Olympic modern pentathletes of Argentina
Modern pentathletes at the 1960 Summer Olympics
People from General Pico